The 2022–23 LFA First Division (known as the Orange First Division for sponsorship reasons) is the 49th season of the LFA First Division (formerly the Liberian Premier League), the top-tier football league in Liberia, since the league's establishment in 1956.

Watanga are the defending champions, having won the 2021–22 season.

Team changes

The following teams have changed division since the 2021–22 season.

To National Second Division
Relegated from First Division
 MC Breweries

From National Second Division
Promoted from Second Division
 Cece United (promoted as champions)
Muscat
Jubilee

Teams

Stadia and locations

Note: Table lists in alphabetical order.

Number of teams by county

League table

Results

Season statistics
As of 2 February 2023.

Top scorers

Source: Soccerway

Hat-tricks

References

Football competitions in Liberia
Liberia
2022 in Liberian sport
2023 in Liberian sport